Jonathan Arthur Scott (born November 7, 1958) is an American television news anchor who hosts Fox Report Weekend on Fox News. Also, Scott is the lead anchor for any breaking news each weekend. Jon Scott longtime co-anchored Happening Now on Fox News until the network expanded America's Newsroom from 2 hours to 3, ending the show in June 2018 after 11 years of being on air. Scott was also the host of Fox News Watch, a program that in September 2013 was replaced by the similar format Media Buzz, which is hosted by Howard Kurtz.

Early life and education
Scott was born in Denver, Colorado, and graduated from Denver Lutheran High School. He studied journalism at the University of Missouri–Columbia.

Career
Scott began his career as a correspondent for KOMU-TV (NBC) in Columbia, Missouri, a station owned and operated by Mizzou. Later, he was the weekday evening news anchor, weekend co-anchor, and reporter for WPLG-TV (ABC) in Miami. He also worked as a reporter and bureau chief for KUSA-TV (NBC) in Denver. Beginning in 1988, Scott was a reporter for the syndicated news program Inside Edition.

From 1992 to 1995 Scott was a correspondent for Dateline NBC. He served as the host of A Current Affair and eventually joined the Fox News Channel in 1996. He is an avid watcher of The MacNeil/Lehrer NewsHour. Scott was hosting Fox News Live during the September 11 attacks and was the first on-air reporter to suggest that the attacks may have been perpetrated by Osama Bin Laden. During May 1 and 2, 2011, he served as the studio anchor for Fox News coverage of the death of Osama bin Laden.

He received an Emmy for news writing for the NBC program Dateline.

Personal life
He is also a licensed pilot, rated to fly single-engine airplanes, and sometimes uses his expertise when covering aviation stories, such as the July 6, 2013, crash of Asiana Airlines Flight 214.

Scott has four children. One son is in the army after graduating from the United States Military Academy in 2011. His older brother was an infantryman in the Vietnam War.

References

External links
 Bio on FoxNews.com
  Jon Scott comes home with Fox News

1958 births
Living people
American television journalists
American broadcast news analysts
Emmy Award winners
People from Denver
Aviators from Colorado
Missouri School of Journalism alumni
Fox News people
American male journalists